The 1880 South Australian Football Association season was the 4th season of the top-level Australian rules football competition in South Australia.

The season opened on 8 May and concluded on 18 September.

 went on to record its 3rd consecutive premiership.

Premiership season

Round 1

Round 2

Round 3

Round 4

Round 5

Round 6

Round 7

Round 8

Round 9

Round 10

Round 11

Round 12

Round 13

Round 14

Ladder

Note: Victorian were ranked above South Adelaide on match ratio (only match was drawn), while Port Adelaide were ranked above 
Kensington on head-to-head record (1-0-1), and Kensington were ranked above South Park on match ratio (both teams were 1-1 head-to-head).

Intercolonial matches
An Association representative team toured South Australia in August, playing three intercolonial matches – two at even strength against the South Australian Football Association representative team, and one against a team of twenty-three South Australian-born players – and winning all three. J. Gibson served as captain of the Association team.

Additional matches
The result of the game was eventually decided to not count towards the premiership. 

The  and  football clubs decided to play another game against each other as their two previous matches during the season resulted in draws.

References

SANFL
South Australian National Football League seasons